My Faithful Husband is a 2015 Philippine television drama romance series broadcast by GMA Network. Directed by Joyce E. Bernal, it stars Jennylyn Mercado and Dennis Trillo. It premiered on August 10, 2015 on the network's Telebabad line up replacing The Rich Man's Daughter. The series concluded on November 13, 2015 with a total of 70 episodes. It was replaced by Beautiful Strangers in its timeslot.

The series is streaming online on YouTube.

Premise
Emman and Mel meet each other and become good friends. Mel finds out that she is pregnant with Dean's child and Emman claims the responsibility to be the child's father and offer to marry Mel. When Dean comes back to Mel's life, Mel gets confused about her feelings, and her weakness leads her to spend a night with Dean.

Cast and characters

Lead cast
 Jennylyn Mercado as Melanie "Mel" Fernandez-Dela Paz
 Dennis Trillo as Emmanuel "Emman" Dela Paz

Supporting cast
 Mikael Daez as Dean Montenegro
 Louise delos Reyes as Mylene Fernandez-Sanreal 
 Snooky Serna as Mercedes "Cedes" Dela Paz
 Rio Locsin as Carmen Beltran (Fernandez)
 Ricky Davao as Arnaldo Castro
 Nonie Buencamino as Lorenz Castro
 Timmy Cruz as Elvira "Elvie" Castro
 Lloyd Samartino as Artemio Fernandez
 Kevin Santos as Dodong
 Jerald Napoles as Mars
 Jade Lopez as Doyee Dela Paz
 Julia Lee as Adelle
 Aaron Yanga as Dante Dela Paz
 Jazz Ocampo as Carla Dela Paz
 Rexcy Evert as Janet

Recurring cast
 Lynn Ynchausti-Cruz as Charito Montenegro-Castro
 Rich Asuncion as Soling
 Lance Serrano as Benjo
 Enzo Pineda as Arnel 
 Coleen Perez as Michelle
 Mega Unciano as Ricky
 Zofia Quinit as Andrea "Ningning" F. Dela Paz
 Kim Margarette Belles as Aliyah Tanya "Ali" F. Montenegro

Guest cast
 Rodjun Cruz as young Arnaldo
 Yasmien Kurdi as young Mercedes
 Neil Ryan Sese as Dr. Pitargue
 Andrea Torres as Samantha "Sam" Fuentebella-Montenegro
 Mike Tan as Bradley "Brad" Sanreal
 Pinky Aseron as Rina Angeles
 Ronnie Henares as Amiel Montenegro

Ratings
According to AGB Nielsen Philippines' Mega Manila household television ratings, the pilot episode of My Faithful Husband earned a 17.6% rating. While the final episode scored a 19.9%
rating. The series had its highest rating on September 10, 2015 with a 20.7% rating. For its entire run, it had an average rating of 17.78%.

Accolades

References

External links
 
 

2015 Philippine television series debuts
2015 Philippine television series endings
Filipino-language television shows
GMA Network drama series
Philippine romance television series
Television shows set in the Philippines